The Frenchman's Mountain Methodist Episcopal Church–South and Cemetery is a historic church in Cato, Arkansas. Located at the junction of Cato, Frenchman Mountain, and Camp Joseph Robinson Roads, it is a single-story wood-frame structure, built in 1880 as a two-story building to house both religious services and the local Masonic lodge. The upper story, housing the lodge facilities, was removed in 1945. The congregation was organized in 1872 in Cato, the oldest community in northern Pulaski County. The church declined after most of the land in the area was taken to establish Camp Joseph T. Robinson, with the church now enclaved within its bounds.

The church and its adjacent cemetery were listed on the National Register of Historic Places in 1976.

See also

 National Register of Historic Places listings in Pulaski County, Arkansas

References

External links
 

Cemeteries in Pulaski County, Arkansas
Cemeteries on the National Register of Historic Places in Arkansas
Churches completed in 1880
Churches in Pulaski County, Arkansas
Churches on the National Register of Historic Places in Arkansas
Methodist churches in Arkansas
National Register of Historic Places in Pulaski County, Arkansas
Cemeteries established in the 1880s